Bob Reinhart (born June 21, 1938) is an American retired basketball coach who served as the men's head coach for the Georgia State Panthers for nine seasons. In 1991, he led the Panthers to their first NCAA tournament appearance. Reinhart was twice named Atlanta Tip-Off Club Coach of the Year. He was inducted into the Indiana Basketball Hall of Fame in 2017.

After his time as head coach at Georgia State, Reinhart spent over two decades as an NBA scout. He worked as a scout for Utah, Boston, Milwaukee, Golden State, and has two championship rings from his time with Miami.

Playing career
A native of Indiana, Reinhart was the starting point guard for the Dale (High School) Golden Aces and played with future Georgia Tech All-American, Roger Kaiser.
Reinhart led the team in assists and was second in scoring behind Kaiser for the 1956 and 1957 sectional champion squads.

In college, Reinhart spent one quarter at Kentucky Wesleyan College before transferring to Indiana University to play for Branch McCracken.

At Indiana, Reinhart was a two-sport letterwinner who led the 1961 baseball team in runs (28).

Early coaching years
Reinhart's coaching career began at the high school level in Indiana with Oakland City. He coached the Acorns for three seasons and managed a .500 record. His move to the Atlanta area was prompted by a call from former teammate, Roger Kaiser, who asked Reinhart to join his staff at Decatur High School. Reinhart spent four seasons as an assistant to Kaiser before becoming Decatur's head coach. He led the boys' team to three state titles ('70, '80, '82) in the 14 years he was the head coach. Reinhart's tenure also included a 57-game win streak, eight trips to the final eight in the state playoffs, and six final fours. His son, Bobby, played on his 1982 title team.

Atlanta Hawks

A household name in the Atlanta basketball scene, Bob Reinhart would work Mike Fratello’s Atlanta Hawks camps every summer. In 1984, Fratello hired Reinhart as an assistant coach on the Hawks staff where he spent two seasons. In those two years, Reinhart coached players including Dominique Wilkins and Doc Rivers.

Head coach at Georgia State

When Reinhart took the head coaching job at Georgia State in 1985, the Panthers had just gone 2–26 the season prior. In his first season, the team finished with 10 wins. In the 1990–91 season, Reinhart's team finished the regular season 13–14 before achieving a series of "firsts" for Georgia State in the conference tournament. GSU had never before won a game in the conference tournament, had never beaten Little Rock, and had been swept in the regular season by all three teams they would end up facing in the tournament. The fifth-seed Panthers went on to beat Stetson, USTA, and Little Rock to win their first Trans America Athletic Conference tournament title and earn the school's first NCAA tournament bid.

Reinhardt's overall record at Georgia State was 107–148. At the time, that was a record number of wins and his nine seasons coached is still a school-record tenure.

Personal life
Bob Reinhart and his wife Jane, have two children; Kelly and Bobby, and four grandchildren.

External links
Indiana Basketball Hall of Fame profile

References

1938 births
Living people
American men's basketball coaches
American men's basketball players
Basketball coaches from Indiana
Basketball players from Indiana
College men's basketball head coaches in the United States
Georgia State Panthers men's basketball coaches
Indiana Hoosiers baseball players
Indiana Hoosiers men's basketball players
High school basketball coaches in the United States
People from Spencer County, Indiana